Spoonful is a Willie Dixon song covered by Howlin' Wolf, Etta James and Cream

measuring spoon
Spoonful.com
Spoonful, album by Jimmy Witherspoon
Spoonful, album by John Hammond, Jr.
Spoonful, album by Will Hoge